Peggy Hartanto (born 1988) is an Indonesian fashion designer. She is the creative director of her eponymous ready-to-wear label Peggy Hartanto, which she co-founded in 2012.

Early life and education 
Born and raised in Surabaya, Indonesia, Hartanto studied at Raffles College of Design and Commerce in Sydney, Australia. She graduated in 2009 with an honor as the best student in fashion design. She briefly worked at one of Australia's leading fashion brands, Collette Dinnigan, before moving back to her hometown to start her own label.

Career 
Hartanto co-founded her high-end ready-to-wear label, PEGGY HARTANTO, with her two sisters, Lydia Hartanto and Petty Hartanto, in 2012. She now acts as the creative director of the brand, where she oversees its womenswear collection every season. The label is known for its definitive design aesthetic, which is characterized by clean lines, bold colors as well as innovative use of fabric and construction in its ready-to-wear offerings for women.

The first Peggy Hartanto collection was introduced at Jakarta Fashion Week in 2012. Since then, she has showcased her collections at various events and participated in trade shows worldwide. The label is now available at numerous boutiques and online retailers in Asia, Middle East and the United Kingdom.

Geena Davis wore Peggy Hartanto's fuchsia pink sleeveless on the show Late Night With Seth Meyers.

Awards and honors 
 2017: The Woolmark Prize Asia Nominee
 2016: Inclusion in the “30 Under 30: The Arts” List by Forbes Asia
 2015: Grazia Next Glam Award Finalist from Grazia International Network
 2014: Her World Young Achiever Award from Her World Indonesia
 2013: Asia New Generation Fashion Designer Award from Harper's Bazaar Indonesia

References

External links
 Official website

Indonesian fashion designers
Indonesian people of Chinese descent
Indonesian women fashion designers
1988 births
Living people